South Carolina Highway 126 (SC 126) is a  primary state highway in the U.S. state of South Carolina. It directly links Belvedere with Clearwater, with a small portion in North Augusta.

Route description
SC 126 is a suburban highway that travels  from U.S. Route 25 (US 25)/SC 121 in Belvedere to SC 421 in Clearwater. In both Belvedere and North Augusta, SC 126 is a four-lane road with median; in Clearwater it only has two lanes. The entire highway has few commercial entities, mainly functioning to connect neighborhoods in the area. It also has intermediate junctions with Interstate 520 (I-520) and US 1/US 78.

History
SC 126 was established in 1939 as a new primary route and has remained unchanged since.  The entire highway was paved by 1948 and widened in Belvedere and North Augusta by 2010.

Future
The remaining two-lane section of SC 126 in Clearwater is planned to be widened to four lanes; however, no time-table has been set.

Major intersections

See also

References

External links

 
 SC 126 at Virginia Highways' South Carolina Highways Annex

126
Transportation in Aiken County, South Carolina
North Augusta, South Carolina